Sweetheart of the Sun is the sixth studio album by The Greencards. It was released in August 2013 by Darling Street Records. It was produced, mixed, and recorded by Gary Paczosa with additional engineering by Shani Gandhi at Minutia Studio. Eric Boulanger mastered the recording at The Mastering Lab.

The album was nominated for Best Folk Album at the 56th Grammy Awards.

David Bowling opines, "Sweetheart of the Sun was an ambitious project for the Greencards and they were able to bring their vision to fruition."
It continues down a musical path started on The Brick Album. According to Shawn Underwood, "There’s more of the etherealness in the arrangements and layers of vocals and instruments and less of the bluegrass origins of the band...[as] if Gillian and Dave borrowed some production techniques from Pink Floyd."

Sweetheart of the Sun is a concept album dealing with the band's connection to water. As such, many critics recommend listening to the album in its entirety rather than as individual songs.

Track listing

Personnel
 Carol Young – vocals, bass, percussion
 Kym Warner – mandolin, mandola, bouzouki, octave OM mandolin, glockenspiel, percussion
 Carl Miner – guitars, omnichord, keys, percussion
 Jedd Hughes – guitars, bouzouki, ukulele, vocals, 
 Kai Welch – guitars, bass, accordion, keys, omnichord, vocals
 David Beck – vocals, bass
 Paul Cauthen – vocals
 Eric Darken – percussion
 Aoife O'Donovan – vocals
 Jon Randall – vocals
 Luke Reynolds – bass, steel guitar
 Andrea Zonn – violin, viola
 Gary Paczosa – producer, recording
 Shani Gandhi – recording

References

2013 albums
The Greencards albums